Dicaelus dilatatus is a species of ground beetle in the family Carabidae. It is found in North America.

Subspecies
These two subspecies belong to the species Dicaelus dilatatus:
 Dicaelus dilatatus dilatatus Say, 1823
 Dicaelus dilatatus sinuatus Ball, 1959

References

Further reading

 

Harpalinae
Articles created by Qbugbot
Beetles described in 1823